Bell Arthur (also known as Bellarthur) is an unincorporated community and census-designated place (CDP) in Pitt County, North Carolina, United States. Its population was 466 as of the 2010 census. Bell Arthur has a post office with ZIP code 27811.

Demographics

References

Census-designated places in North Carolina
Census-designated places in Pitt County, North Carolina
Unincorporated communities in North Carolina
Unincorporated communities in Pitt County, North Carolina